Çayırhan power station is a 620 MW operational coal fired power station in Turkey and a proposed 800 MW extension, in Ankara Province. In 2019 land was expropriated for another lignite mine, to feed the new plant, which is being opposed as uneconomic and polluting.

History
In 2017 the government privatized the Çayırhan-B lignite coalfield on condition a coal-fired power plant is built, in the hope that it would be the first of a wave of similar deals for various lignite coalfields around the country.

Ownership
The project is a joint venture between Kolin, Kalyon and Çelikler.

Finance
The cost of the extension is estimated at $1.1-billion.

Subsidies
The government is giving a 15-year purchase guarantee.

Economics
The winning consortium bid $60.4 per megawatt, but according to opponents of the extension expanding Turkey's solar power would save taxpayers money in the long term.

Employment
The company says it will employ 500 people in the plant and 1,500 for coal mining.

Coal supply

As Turkish lignite is heavy compared to its energy content coal must be sourced locally. Coalfields in Ankara province include Beypazarı-Çayırhan, Gölbaşı-Karagedik, Gölbaşı-Bahçeköy, Ayaş-Kayıbucak and Şereflikoçhisar.

Electricity generation

Environmental Impact
Despite the environmental impact assessment having been approved opponents of the extension claim the environment will be damaged.

Dust
 the plant is operating with inadequate dust filters and Turkey has no legal limit on ambient fine particules (PM2.5). Opponents claim that Nallıhan bird sanctuary, 6 km away, could be damaged.

Sulfur Dioxide
 the plant is operating with inadequate sulfur treatment, and the area is a sulfur dioxide air pollution hotspot

Nitrogen oxides
 the plant is operating without sufficient NOx filtering.

Greenhouse gases
After extension the power station would contribute an estimated 4 megatonnes (Mt) a year to Turkey's greenhouse gas emissions. As Turkey has no carbon emission trading it would not be economically viable to capture and store the gas.

Opposition
The Chamber of Mechanical Engineers has questioned why the existing plant was granted a 2020 operating license without meeting air pollution standards. Opponents include Ankara 350.org and singer Tarkan.

See also

Energy policy of Turkey
List of power stations in Turkey
Electricity sector in Turkey

References

External links
 Çayırhan power station on Global Energy Monitor
  2016 Environmental Impact Assessment (Turkish)
  2018 Environmental Impact Assessment (Turkish)

Coal-fired power stations in Turkey
Buildings and structures in Ankara
Protests in Turkey
Environmentalism in Turkey